For the Love of Ray J was a dating show on VH1 that featured hip hop singer Ray J. The program had a format similar to Flavor of Love, I Love New York, and Rock of Love. One source notes that it "will be produced by the same geniuses" as those shows, 51 Minds. In reference to the series, Ray J said:

The show, which premiered on February 2, 2009, followed Ray J and his entourage of female suitors to  clubs in Los Angeles, to Las Vegas where they partied with his friends, and to Ray's childhood home where they met his family and older sister Brandy Norwood.

According to one commentator, the concept of the show involves pampering the contestants with "upscale trips throughout the series" and "Ray J's so in love that he's already given participating girls names like Cashmere, Unique and Hot Cocoa."

Contestants

Contestant Notes
Joanna "Cocktail" was on the first season of The Bad Girls Club. In episode 15, she was brought on the show and stayed for the remaining 7 episodes.
 Stacks withdrew from the competition because of family matters.
 Lil' Hood left because she felt she was being disrespected.
 Cashmere withdrew from the competition because she couldn't handle it anymore
 Danger was asked to leave by Ray J because he feared for her health and safety, as well as that of himself and the other contestants.

Call-out order

 The contestant won Ray J's love.
 The contestant went on a group date with Ray J.
 The contestant went on an individual date with Ray J.
 The contestant was eliminated.
 The contestant quit the competition.
 The contestant won a date with Ray J, but was eliminated.
 The contestant was eliminated at the beginning of the elimination ceremony.
 The contestant won a date with Ray J, but quit the competition.
 The contestant was going to receive a glass, but quit the competition.
 The contestant lost a challenge, but got to join the winning team on the date due to Ray J's choice.
 The contestant was eliminated outside of the elimination ceremony.

Episode 4 Ray J told the girls that everyone was safe except Caviar; names are alphabetical.
Episode 5 Because Stacks and Lil Hood quit, Ray J did not eliminate any of the remaining girls; names are alphabetical.
Episode 6 Ray J told Cashmere that she could pick up the glass if she wanted to stay, but she could not handle the pressure and left.
Episode 9 Ray J said that he needed to meet the girls' parents before he could make a decision.
Episode 10 was a recap episode.
Episode 11 Ray J decided to eliminate Unique and he chose to pick Cocktail.
Episode 12 This was a reunion show. Ray J and Cocktail are going to try to maintain a relationship.

Episodes

A Tall Glass of Chardonnay
First aired February 2, 2009

Bottom Three: Naturalle, Hot Cocoa, Chardonnay
Eliminated: Hot Cocoa, Naturalle
Episode Notes
Ray J's godsister Lil B will help him make the decisions along the way.
Chardonnay does the splits for Ray J in front of everyone and he almost eliminates her, because he thought she was too forward with her sexual side.
Ray J gives the girls glasses of champagne.
Reasons For Elimination
Naturalle: Ray J felt that she was there more for her acting career, than trying to be with him
Hot Cocoa: Ray J felt that she didn't make an effort to get to know him

Video Thrilled the Radio Star
First Aired February 9, 2009

Challenge: Video Thrilled
Challenge Winners: Danger, Cocktail, Chardonnay
Bottom Three: Atomic Bomb, Caviar, Genuine
Eliminated: Atomic Bomb, Genuine

Episode Notes
 During the video chat challenge, Chardonnay made herself a human banana split, with her putting the ice cream over her body, doing the split, and eating a banana.
 The challenge winners were automatically picked first by Ray J to stay in the house longer.

Reasons for Elimination
 Atomic Bomb: Ray J felt that she didn't open up to him.
 Genuine: Ray J felt that she was confusing him, first she saying she didn't like being in front of the camera, later mentioning she wanted to be an actress.

The Foxes are Feuding
First aired February 16, 2009 (2.254M viewers)

Guest Star: Tommy Davidson
Challenge: Foxy Feud
Divas: Lil Hood, Feisty, Chardonnay, Cocktail, Caviar
Darlings: Danger, Unique, Cashmere, Stilts, Stacks
Challenge Winners: Darling/Conservative Girls
Captain Winner: Stilts
Bottom 2: Stilts & Caviar
Eliminated: Stilts
Episode Notes
Ray J has the girls play a game called "Foxy Feud" which is a parody of Family Feud.
Reasons for Elimination
 Stilts: Ray J found out that she is still legally married.

There's Something about Larry
First Aired February 23, 2009

 Guest Star: Big Boy (of Power 106), Willie Norwood
 Challenge: Motown competition
 Winners: Lil Hood, Cashmere, Cocktail
 Eliminated: Caviar

Episode Notes
 While Ray J was serenading Cocktail on their solo date, Cocktail started tearing up, realizing that Ray J might have a connection with her and Cocktail starting to fall in love with him.
 Ray J was suspicious about Caviar talking on the phone with Larry so he called in and found out the real truth.

Reason For elimination
 Caviar: Ray J found that Larry managed 395 girls around the world and found that Caviar is here only for exposure.

The Squeaky Wheel Gets the Oil
First Aired March 2, 2009 (2.434M viewers)

 Guest Star: Jack Mosley
 Challenge: Boxing Competition (Pink vs. Blue)
Pink Team: Lil Hood, Cocktail, Danger, Chardonnay
Blue Team: Feisty, Stacks, Unique, Cashmere
 Challenge Winners: Pink Team, Feisty
 Challenge Losers: Blue Team (except for Feisty)
 Quit: Stacks, Lil' Hood

Episode Notes
  Ray let Feisty go on the date because the rest of her team quit the challenge and she was the only one to participate, and win, before they quit. He felt her teammates were unfair.
  Stacks left the competition due to family matters and Ray understood
  Lil' Hood left because she felt she was being disrespected.

Bad Girls, Bad Girls Whatcha Gonna Do?
First aired March 16, 2009 (2.701M viewers)

Challenge: Show Ray something each girl is passionate about so he can get to know them better.
Challenge Winner: Feisty and Unique
Withdrew: Cashmere

Reason For withdrawal
Cashmere: Cashmere felt the pressure amongst the other girls coming back on her for outing Cocktail's involvement in 6 episodes of The Bad Girls Club (later in the first season, credited as Joanna Hernandez, a golddigger, which Ray forgave as part of Cocktail's past) built up to a level that was too much for her to handle. The wine glass was there for the taking, but Ray was not about to pick it up and hand it to her, and she couldn't bring herself to take it, which qualifies as a voluntary withdrawal.

Rock and Roll All Night, and Feisty Every Day
First aired March 23, 2009 (2.346M viewers)

Challenge: The Norwood Kids Foundation Pancake Challenge.
Challenge Winner: Cocktail, Chardonnay, Unique
Bottom 2: Unique, Feisty
Eliminated: Feisty

Reason for Elimination
Feisty: Ray J felt that Feisty was just a party girl and was always drunk.

To Tell the Truth
First aired March 30, 2009

Guest Star: Brandy
Challenge: Lie Detector Test
Challenge Winner: Chardonnay
Bottom 2: Danger, Chardonnay
Eliminated: Chardonnay

Reason for Elimination
Chardonnay:  Ray J felt that she was more of a friend than a potential love interest

Episode Notes
 For the solo date, Ray J took Chardonnay to a strip club where she showed him some of her moves.

Smashing Homies
First aired April 6, 2009 (3.164M viewers)

Guest Stars: Tom Green, Shorty Mack, Warren G, Noel "Detail" Fisher, Willie Norwood, Alia Kruz
Eliminated: None

Episode Notes
No one gets eliminated.  Ray is waiting to meet each girl's family before he makes an elimination.
Willie Norwood makes a second appearance in the show.

Clip Show
First Aired April 13, 2009

Never Seen Clips
Chardonnay, Cocktail and rest of the girls Partying.
More of what happened in the video thrilled challenge
Stilts and Ray J went to a studio recording.
Feisty Partying and drinking, Chardonnay teaching Feisty how to do a split.
Cocktail telling Ray J about the other girls, what they are doing in the house.
Unique and Danger having the argument.
Feisty being northern tropical
Ray J and Chardonnay went to a strip club.
Tom Green rapping to Ray J about Danger, including the extended remix version of "Danger: She Smashed The Homies."
Feisty, Unique, Cavier, Danger and Stacks were in the kitchen having a conversation.
The girls interrupt Ray J's conversations.
The girls playing "Two Truths and a Lie" with each other, where you have to figure out which of the three statements isn't true.
Lil'B and the girls imitating each other.
Unique, Cocktail and Danger cooks food for Ray J and his parents.
Ray J talks about the final 3 girls for the season finale.

What Doesn't Happen in Vegas, Stays in Vegas
First aired April 20, 2009 (4.22M viewers)

Disqualified: Danger
Families: Ray J takes each girl to meet her family.
Unique's Family: Ray J and Unique went to Cleveland, to see Unique's Family.
Cocktail's Family: Ray J and Cocktail went to Sacramento, to see Cocktail's Family.
Dates: Ray J takes each girl on an individual date.
Unique's Date: Ray J takes Unique to Alizé for her date, and an overnight stay in Ray J's Room.
Cocktail's Date: Ray J takes Cocktail to Simon's Restaurant for her date, and an overnight stay in Ray J's Room.
Winner: Cocktail
Runner-Up: Unique

Episode Notes
 Ray J privately told Danger it was time to go home because he feared for her stability, health and safety.

Reasons for Elimination
 Unique: Ray J felt that she might be a little bit too controlling and meeting her family makes him more nervous like he was expected to be someone he isn't.

Reunion Show
First aired April 27, 2009 (3.753M viewers)

Episode Notes
 Stilts talks about her time on the show and question of her marriage.
 Caviar talks about her time on the show and her photographer, Larry.
 Chardonnay talks about her and Ray J being friends.
 Danger talks about her health and pregnancy rumors.
 Unique talks about her time on the show and eliminating girls she associates with, including Cashmere.
 Cocktail talks about her time with Ray J.

Bonus Clips
 Feisty and Lil Hood talk about their time on the show.

Host: La La Vasquez

Aftermath
On June 10, 2009, Cocktail announced on her MySpace page that she and Ray were no longer a couple, and had "not been together for a while now."  Two days later, she alleged in an interview that Ray J had hurt her by lying to her about whether there would be a second season of the show, and that the "breaking point" came on tour when she realized that he was still "hooking up" with other girls, but that's when Ray J realized that she was serious about the relationship he was honest with her and told her that it was "not going to work out."

After the show

Chardonnay and Danger made a guest appearance on the second season.
Cocktail has made her first televised appearance on the first season of The Bad Girls Club
Cocktail made an appearance on the For the Love of Ray J (season 2) reunion show.
Lil' Hood (Chelsey), Cashmere (Leah), and Cocktail (Joanna Hernandez) were contestants on the canceled third season of I Love Money.
Feisty (Elizabeth Mendez) competed on the fourth season of I Love Money, being the only For the Love of Ray J girl. She was eliminated in episode 6. She was also in the music video for Pitbull's "Hotel Room Service" in 2009.

References

External links

For The Love of Ray J: Cast

2009 American television seasons